Sanqing may refer to:

Three Pure Ones, or Sanqing in Chinese, the three highest Taoist deities
Mount Sanqing, mountain in Jiangxi, China